Josh Kelly (born 7 March 1994) is a British professional boxer. As an amateur competed in the men's welterweight event at the 2016 Summer Olympics and the 2015 European Games, in which he won a bronze medal, representing Great Britain. Kelly has held the WBA International welterweight title in 2018 and the Commonwealth welterweight title in 2018.

He is a supporter of Sunderland AFC

Professional career
Having competed in the Olympics, Kelly's first fight as a professional was a six rounds points victory (59-55) against Jay Byrne (4-1) of Dublin in April 2017 at the SSE Hydro in Glasgow on the undercard of Ricky Burns vs. Julius Indongo.

Kelly won his next two fights in the next two months, defeating Spain's Jony Vila (6-1) and Gateshead's Tom Whitfield (4-1) by fourth-round stoppage and first-round knockout respectively. The Vila fight took place at the Barclaycard Arena, Birmingham in May whilst the Whitfield fight took place at the Walker Activity Dome, Newcastle in June, with his fight being the main event.

Kelly finished the year with a record of 5-0 after victories over Mexico's Jose Luis Zuniga (13-2-1) and France's Jean Michel Hamilcaro (25-8-3), winning by second-round stoppage and sixth-round stoppage respectively in October and December. Those fights took place at the SSE Arena, Belfast and the York Hall, London.

Kelly vs. Robinson 
On June 1, 2019, Kelly fought Ray Robinson, who was ranked #13 by the WBC and #15 by the WBO at welterweight. Kelly was ranked #9 by the WBA at welterweight. The contest was even and ended up in a majority draw, with one scorecard going in favour of Kelly, 96-94, while the other two read 95-95 twice.

Kelly vs. Campos 
In his next fight, Kelly fought Wiston Campos. Kelly was struggling to handle Campos at times, but nonetheless managed to win the bout via unanimous decision, scoring 99-90, 99-90 and 98-91 on the scorecards.

Kelly vs. Avanesyan 
In his next fight, Kelly fought highly ranked welterweight David Avanesyan, who was ranked #6 by the IBF, #7 by the WBC, #9 by the WBA and #10 by the WBO at the time. Avanesyan showed to be the better man on the night and finished Kelly within six rounds.

Kelly is the current British light middleweight champion after beating Troy Williamson by unanimous decision at the Newcastle Arena on 2nd December 2022.

Professional boxing record

References

External links
 
 
 
 
 
 Josh Kelly - Profile, News Archive & Current Rankings at Box.Live

1994 births
Living people
English male boxers
Olympic boxers of Great Britain
Boxers at the 2016 Summer Olympics
Boxers at the 2015 European Games
European Games medalists in boxing
European Games bronze medalists for Great Britain
Sportspeople from Sunderland
Welterweight boxers